Schreckensteinia jocularis is a moth in the family Schreckensteiniidae. It was described by Walsingham in 1914.

References

Schreckensteinioidea
Moths described in 1914